KMQX (88.5 FM) is a community radio station licensed to Weatherford, Texas. The station serves the area around Mineral Wells, Weatherford and Jacksboro. The station is one of the five stations in the "QXFM" GROUP of stations. The others are KYQX, KEQX, KQXB and KQXE.

External links

 DFW Radio/TV History

Oldies radio stations in the United States
MQX